Ati language may refer to:

Ati language (China)
Ati language (Nigeria)
Ati language (Philippines)
Ati language (Vanuatu)